The Queen's Cup is a trophy awarded annually to the champion in men's ice hockey of the Ontario University Athletics conference of U Sports. It has been awarded since 1903 to the champion between Ontario and Quebec universities. It is the second-oldest ice hockey trophy still being awarded, after the Stanley Cup.

The QUAA (now named the RSEQ) ceased to operate a university hockey league after the 1986–87 season. The conference's three remaining teams at that point (McGill Redmen, UQTR Patriotes, and Concordia Stingers) joined, and remain, in the OUA conference. One of the conditions of the merger was the Queen's Cup, representing the OUA champion, must be challenged for at an OUA institution - as such, when the OUA-East champion should host such a game and that school is based in Quebec, the game shall be hosted by the OUA-West team, while the OUA-East team shall have 'home' standing (last change).

History
For the 1902–03 season, McGill University, Queen's University and the University of Toronto founded the Canadian Intercollegiate Hockey Union. The Queen's Cup, emblematic of the CIHU championship was donated by Queen's University of Kingston, Ontario. The Queen's Cup was not presented during the war years of 1915–16, 1916–17, 1917–18, 1918–19, 1940–41, 1941–42, 1942–43, 1943–44, nor 1944–45. The first winner other than the founders was the Université de Montréal in 1949. By the 1960s, other universities, including Ontario Agricultural College (Guelph), McMaster, Waterloo and Western were granted membership and became eligible to win the Cup. Other universities have since joined the CIHU, now known as the OUA conference. The original Cup was retired in 2000 to the Hockey Hall of Fame. The 2021 championship was cancelled due to the COVID-19 pandemic in Canada.

Playoff era

Three Division format
Bolded are Queen's Cup champions, italicized are runner-up, score is championship game only.

East vs. West format
Bolded are Queen's Cup champions.

Source: McGill University, OUA

Championships by team
The Toronto Varsity Blues have won the most OUA championships with 41, including a record 11 consecutively between the 1914-15 to 1928-29 seasons.

See also
 University Cup
 Réseau du sport étudiant du Québec

References

U Sports ice hockey trophies and awards
Ice hockey tournaments in Canada
U Sports ice hockey
Ontario awards